The Edel 820 is a French sailboat that was designed by Maurice Edel and first built in 1980.

Production
The design was built by Construction Nautic Edel in France and also at its Canadian subsidiary, Edel Canada. Between 1980 and 1982 a total of 60 examples were completed. The boat is now out of production.

Design

The Edel 820 is a recreational keelboat, built predominantly of fiberglass, with teak wood trim. It has a masthead sloop rig, a raked stem, a reverse transom, an internally mounted spade-type rudder controlled by a wheel or tiller and a fixed fin keel or stub keel and centreboard. It displaces  and carries  of ballast.

The boat is fitted with a Swedish Volvo Penta MD7A diesel engine of  connected to a Volvo Penta 110S  saildrive. Some boats have been retrofitted with a small outboard motor in place of the inboard diesel, for docking and maneuvering.

Below decks the design has  headroom. Sleeping accommodation is provided for six adults, with a "V"-berth forward, two berths in the main cabin and two aft berths. The design employs teak brightwork. The galley has a two-burner gimbaled propane-powered stove an ice box and a manually-pumped water system. There is also a navigation chart table and a head with an  tank.

See also
List of sailing boat types

Similar sailboats
Aloha 27
C&C 27
C&C SR 27
Cal 27
Cal 2-27
Cal 3-27
Catalina 27
Catalina 270
Crown 28
CS 27
Express 27
Fantasia 27
Halman Horizon
Hotfoot 27
Hullmaster 27
Hunter 27
Hunter 27-2
Hunter 27-3
Island Packet 27
Mirage 27 (Perry)
Mirage 27 (Schmidt)
O'Day 272
Orion 27-2
Tanzer 27
Watkins 27
Watkins 27P

References

External links

Keelboats
1980s sailboat type designs
Sailing yachts
Sailboat type designs by Maurice Edel
Sailboat types built by Edel